Qepchaq (also Romanized as Qepchāq; also known as Qebjān) is a village in, and the capital of, Qepchaq Rural District of the Central District of Chaharborj County, West Azerbaijan province, Iran. At the 2006 National Census, its population was 3,183 in 803 households, when it was in Marhemetabad-e Shomali Rural District of the former Marhemetabad District of Miandoab County. The following census in 2011 counted 3,562 people in 963 households. The latest census in 2016 showed a population of 3,669 people in 1,098 households. Marhemetabad District was separated from Miandoab County, elevated to the status of Chaharborj County, and divided into two districts in 2020.

References 

Populated places in West Azerbaijan Province